The 2010 Viennese state election was held on 10 October 2010 to elect the members of the Gemeinderat and Landtag of Vienna.

The Social Democratic Party of Austria (SPÖ) lost its absolute majority for the first time since 1996. The Freedom Party of Austria (FPÖ) became the second largest party on a swing of eleven percentage points, while the Austrian People's Party (ÖVP) and The Greens both suffered losses. Mayor and Governor Michael Häupl was ultimately re-elected after the SPÖ formed a coalition with The Greens, the first state-level "red-green" coalition in Austrian history.

Background
The Viennese constitution mandates that cabinet positions in the city government (city councillors) be allocated between parties proportionally in accordance with the share of votes won by each; this is known as Proporz. The number of city councillors is voted upon by the Landtag after each election, and may legally vary between nine and fifteen. City councillors are divided into two groups – "senior" councillors, who hold a cabinet portfolio, and "non-executive" councillors who do not. Non-executive councillors may vote in cabinet meetings, but do not otherwise hold any government responsibility. In practice, parties seek to form a coalition which holds a majority in both the Landtag and city government. City councillors bound to the coalition become senior councillors, while the opposition are relegated to non-executive status.

In the 2005 state election, the SPÖ increased its majority, while the opposition was divided between the ÖVP (18.8%), FPÖ (14.8%), and Greens (14.6%). Unusually, the Greens won one more seat than the FPÖ despite winning fewer votes; they also won an additional city councillor. The SPÖ won nine councillors, the ÖVP and Greens two each, and the FPÖ one. The SPÖ formed government alone.

Electoral system
The 100 seats of the Gemeinderat and Landtag of Vienna are elected via open list proportional representation in a two-step process. The seats are distributed between eighteen multi-member constituencies. For parties to receive any representation in the Landtag, they must either win at least one seat in a constituency directly, or clear a 5 percent state-wide electoral threshold. Seats are distributed in constituencies according to the Hare quota, with any remaining seats allocated using the D'Hondt method at the state level, to ensure overall proportionality between a party's vote share and its share of seats.

Contesting parties
The table below lists parties represented in the previous Landtag.

In addition to the parties already represented in the Landtag, six parties collected enough signatures to be placed on the ballot.

 Alliance for the Future of Austria (BZÖ)
 Communist Party of Austria (KPÖ)
 Liberal Forum (LIF) – on the ballot only in 15 constituencies
 MUT Party, Human Environment Animal Welfare (MUT) – on the ballot only in Centre and Inner West
 Direct Democracy Platform (DEM) – on the ballot only in Donaustadt
 Socialist Left Party (SLP) – on the ballot only in Brigittenau

Results

Results by constituency

Aftermath
After the election, Häupl did not commit to negotiations with any party, but did rule out a coalition with the FPÖ. He stated he would not conduct simultaneous parallel negotiations with both the ÖVP and Greens. FPÖ leader Strache stated that he was open to any potential coalition, and declared he would remain in Vienna state politics to serve in the most senior position were available to him; mayor, deputy mayor, or city councillor. There were divisions within the ÖVP, as some members favoured remaining in opposition to build the party's profile with hopes of making gains in the next election.

There was substantial support for a prospective SPÖ-Green coalition within both parties. Regional SPÖ leaders Michael Ritsch and Peter Kaiser both spoke out in favour, as did Stefan Schennach, a former Green politician who joined the SPÖ earlier in the year. The Socialist Youth Austria also preferred this arrangement. Shortly after the election, a website titled "red-green for Vienna" was registered, featuring statements of support from various public figures, including director David Schalko, student activist Barbara Blaha, journalist Robert Misik, and former Liberal Forum leader Heide Schmidt.

At a party meeting, the Greens unanimously voted to begin negotiations with the SPÖ. This was reciprocated on 22 October. On 12 November, the two parties announced that they had agreed come to a coalition agreement. Greens leader Maria Vassilakou became Councillor for Urban Planning, Traffic & Transport, Climate Protection, Energy Planning and Public Participation in the fifth Häupl cabinet. This was the first time a coalition government of the SPÖ and Greens had taken office in an Austrian state.

References

Viennese state election
State elections in Austria
Viennese state election
Politics of Vienna